Roland Curram (born 1932) is an English actor and novelist.

Curram was educated at Brighton College and has had a long film, television and theatre career. His appearances include Julie Christie's travelling companion in her Oscar-winning film Darling and expatriate Freddie in the BBC soap opera Eldorado. In 1979, he played Brian Pilbeam in the first series of Terry and June. The Pilbeams were Terry and June's annoying neighbours until the Sprys moved in.

He also starred as Harold Perkins in the acclaimed BBC TV series Big Jim and the Figaro Club which was broadcast in July and August 1981.

He was married from 1964 until 1985 to the actress Sheila Gish, with whom he had two daughters, the actors Lou Gish (1967–2006) and Kay Curram (born 1974). Curram came out as gay in the early 1990s, and has since left acting to carve out a second career as a novelist.

Selected filmography
 Up to His Neck (1954)
 The Admirable Crichton (1957)
 Dunkirk (1958)
 The Green Helmet (1961)
 Incident at Midnight (1963)
 Darling (1965)
 I'll Never Forget What's'isname (1967)
 Decline and Fall... of a Birdwatcher (1968)
 Every Home Should Have One (1970)
 Ooh... You Are Awful (1972)
 Hardcore (1977)
 Let's Get Laid (1978)
 Madame Sousatzka (1988)
 Parting Shots (1999)

Bibliography 
 Man on the Beach (2004)
 The Rose Secateurs (2007)
 Mother Loved Funerals (2009)
 The Problem with Happiness (2012)

References

External links 
 

1932 births
20th-century English male actors
21st-century English male actors
21st-century English male writers
21st-century English novelists
English male film actors
English male stage actors
English male novelists
English male television actors
English gay actors
British gay writers
English LGBT actors
English LGBT writers
Living people